Joel Benton (May 29, 1832 – September 15, 1911) was an American writer, poet and lecturer.

Biography
Benton was born in Amenia, Dutchess County, New York. He worked as a teacher, writer and lecturer.

As well as producing poetry, he wrote Emerson As A Poet (1882), The Truth About Protection (1892), Greeley on Lincoln (1893), In the Poe Circle (1899) and The Life of Phineas T. Barnum.

He died in 1911 in Poughkeepsie.

References

External links 
 

 
 

1832 births
1911 deaths
People from Amenia, New York
Writers from Poughkeepsie, New York
19th-century American poets
American male poets
Poets from New York (state)
19th-century American male writers